Lignus  is a genus of air-breathing tropical land snails, terrestrial pulmonate gastropod mollusks in the subfamily Achatininae of the  family Achatinidae.

Species
 Lignus alabaster (Rang, 1831)
 Lignus batesi (Preston, 1909)
 Lignus belli (Germain, 1908)
 Lignus cailleanus (Morelet, 1848)
 Lignus efulensis (Preston, 1909)
 Lignus interstinctus (Gould, 1843)
 Lignus mucidus (Gould, 1850)
 Lignus solimanus (Morelet, 1848)
 Lignus tenuis Gray, 1834
 Lignus verdieri (Chaper, 1885)
 Lignus zegzeg (Morelet, 1848)
Taxon inquirendum
 Lignus turbinatus (I. Lea, 1841)

References

 Morelet, A., 1848 Revue zoologique.
 Bank, R. A. (2017). Classification of the Recent terrestrial Gastropoda of the World. Last update: July 16th, 2017

External links

 Gray, J. E. (1834). Land and freshwater shells hitherto undescribed. Proceedings of the Zoological Society of London. (1834) 2: 63-68
 Mörch, O. A. L. (1852-1853). Catalogus conchyliorum quae reliquit D. Alphonso d'Aguirra & Gadea Comes de Yoldi, Regis Daniae Cubiculariorum Princeps, Ordinis Dannebrogici in Prima Classe & Ordinis Caroli Tertii Eques. Fasc. 1, Cephalophora, 170 pp. [1852; Fasc. 2, Acephala, Annulata, Cirripedia, Echinodermata, 74 [+2] pp. [1853]. Hafniae [Copenhagen]: L. Klein.]
 Shuttleworth, R. J. (1856). Beiträge zur näheren Kenntniss der Mollusken. Notitiae Malacologicae. 1: 1-90, pls 1-9

Achatinidae